Kanarieberg (English: Canary Hill) is the name of a road and hill in the municipality of Ronse, in the Belgian province of East Flanders. With its top at 131 m, it is the one of the many hills in the Flemish Ardennes, located in the heart of the hill region. The road of the Kanarieberg starts gently before steadily getting steeper as it winds its way through the fields outside Ronse's city center. It is surfaced in smooth asphalt; its steepest point is 14%. The top of the Kanarieberg is in the Muziekbos (English: Music Forest).

Cycling
The hill regularly features in the Flemish cycling races in spring. In 2014 the climb made its first appearance in the Tour of Flanders, in the roadbook just immediately before the second ascent of the Oude Kwaremont. The climb is also regularly included in the Three Days of De Panne, Halle–Ingooigem and occasionally in the Eneco Tour.

References

External links
 Kanarieberg trajectory on Google Maps

Climbs in cycle racing in Belgium
Tour of Flanders
Mountains and hills of East Flanders